Cyclotorna experta is a moth of the family Cyclotornidae. It is found in Australia.

Moths of Australia
Cyclotornidae
Taxa named by Edward Meyrick
Moths described in 1912